Louis Orville Breithaupt (October 28, 1890 – December 12, 1960) served as the 18th Lieutenant Governor of Ontario, Canada, from 1952 to 1957.

Life and career
Born in Berlin (later Kitchener), Ontario, the son of Emma Alvarine (Devitt) and Louis Jacob Breithaupt, he was educated at the University of Toronto. He became head of his family's leather business, Breithaupt Leather Company, in Kitchener. He was a Kitchener alderman for four years, and in 1923 became the youngest mayor in the city's history. He was a Liberal Member of Parliament from 1940 to 1952.

Breithaupt was appointed Lieutenant Governor of Ontario in 1952 and served until 1957.

In 1953, he was awarded an honorary LL.D from McMaster University.

Breithaupt was active in many service organizations, such as the YMCA and Rotary Club. In 1959, he became Chancellor of Victoria University. Breithaupt died in Toronto in 1960 at the age of 70. He was buried along with the rest of his family at Kitchener's Mount Hope Cemetery.

References 

Lieutenant Governors of Ontario
Members of the House of Commons of Canada from Ontario
Liberal Party of Canada MPs
University of Toronto alumni
Canadian university and college chancellors
Members of the United Church of Canada
Canadian people of German descent
1890 births
1960 deaths
Mayors of Kitchener, Ontario
Burials at Mount Hope Cemetery, Kitchener, Ontario